Dr. Gawdat Gabra (born 1947) (Coptic: Ⲅⲁⲩⲇⲁⲧ Ⲅⲁⲃⲣⲁ) is a Coptologist; he finished his bachelor's degree in Egyptian Antiquities – Cairo University 1967 and  PhD in Coptic Antiquities University of Münster – Germany 1978. He studied in the Institute of Egyptology of the Charles University in Prague, too. 

He is the former director of the Coptic Museum in Cairo (1985) and currently a visiting professor in Coptic Studies at Claremont Graduate University.

He is the author or the co-author, among other titles, of:
Christianity and Monasticism in Upper Egypt: Akhmim and Sohag (Gabra and Takla 2008)
The Churches of Egypt: From the Journey of the Holy Family to the Present Day (Gabra, Van Loon, and Sonbol 2007)
The Treasures of Coptic Art in the Coptic Museum and Churches of Old Cairo (Alcock and Gabra 2007)
Coptic Monasteries: Egypt's Monastic Art and Architecture (Gabra and Vivian 2002)
Christian Egypt: Coptic Art and Monuments Through Two Millennia (Capuani, Meinardus, Rutschowscaya and Gabra 2002)
Icons of the Nile Valley (main author Zuzana Skálová. (Egyptian  International Publishing Company – Longman, 1st Edition 2003, 2nd Edition 2006; 
Be Thou There: The Holy Family's Journey in Egypt (Gabra 2001)

Gabra also contributed the following articles to the Coptic Encyclopedia:

"Saint Pisentius" (co-authored with C. Detlef G. Muller)
"Nabis" 
"Patape" (co-authored with Rene-Georges Coquin)
"Hajir Idfu"

See also 
List of Copts
Coptic Museum

External links
Dr. Gabra's page on the Coptic Museum site
Dr. Gabra articles in the Coptic Encyclopedia 
Dr. Gabra's page on Ambilac Coptic Research site
Books by Gawdat Gabra

21st-century Egyptian historians
Coptologists
Claremont Graduate University faculty
University of Münster alumni
1947 births
Living people
20th-century Egyptian historians